Yann Goulet (or Yann Renard-Goulet; 20 August 1914 – 22 August 1999) was a French sculptor, Breton nationalist and war-time collaborationist with Nazi Germany who headed the Breton Bagadou Stourm militia. He later took Irish citizenship and became professor of sculpture at the Royal Hibernian Academy.

Early career
Goulet was born in Saint-Nazaire. Before World War II, he was a member of the Breton National Party, and a former member of the French Section of the Workers' International (SFIO). His artistic career began at the École nationale supérieure des Beaux-Arts, where he studied art and architecture, and learned sculpture with Auguste Rodin's assistant, Charles Despiau. His works in France include bas-reliefs shown at the Exposition International de Paris (1938), and the monument to the youth of the French empire in Lille (1939). He was part of the Breton artistic movement Seiz Breur.

Goulet's involvement in Breton nationalism led to accusations that he had orchestrated the destruction the Monument to the Breton-Angevin Federation at Pontivy on 18 December 1938 by Gwenn ha du, the nationalist terrorist group. He was detained, but then released.

World War II

French army
In 1939, he was sent to Strasbourg to study the art of sabotage. He participated in the beginning of World War II fighting for France, and was captured by the Germans on 11 June 1940 while blowing up a bridge on the Aisne with friends from a French corps.

Bagadou Stourm

Later in the war, he joined the assault section of Bagadou Stourm, Breton nationalist stormtroopers allied to the Germans. He also collaborated with the pro-Nazi nationalist newspaper L'Heure Bretonne. In 1941 in Paris, he became head of Bagadou Stourm and the "Youth Organizations" of the Parti National Breton. The promotion of Bagadou Stourm officers was named "Patrick Pearse" to commemorate the 25th anniversary of the 1916 Easter Rising against British rule in Ireland.

Artistic career in Ireland

After the liberation of France, Goulet travelled with his wife and children to Ireland, and was sentenced to death as a Collaborationist by a French court in his absence. The painter Camille Souter took up sculpture in 1950 under his guidance. 

He acquired Irish citizenship in 1952 and became an art professor.

He was commissioned to create public works commemorating the IRA and other republicans, including the Custom House Memorial (Dublin), the East Mayo Brigade IRA Memorial, the Republican Memorial (Crossmaglen), and the Ballyseedy Memorial (Kerry). He exhibited regularly at the Royal Hibernian Academy, eventually becoming the RHA Professor of Sculpture. He was also made a member of Aosdána in 1982.

Liberation Front of Brittany
Towards the end of the 1960s, he claimed to have taken the reins of the Liberation Front of Brittany (Front de Libération de la Bretagne, or FLB) and to have been behind all their attacks.

On 1969, he became secretary general and chair of the Comité National de la Bretagne Libre and published the communiques of the FLB. In 1968, the head of police in Bray congratulated him on organising the previous day's attack on the CRS barracks  in Saint-Brieuc. His friends called him "tonton Yann", but sceptics referred to him as "Général micro".

Goulet often claimed "[there was a] national revolution that we missed in 1940" ("révolution nationale qu'on a manquée en 1940")

Death
Goulet died at Bray, County Wicklow, on 22 August 1999, two days after his 85th birthday.

References

External links
 Sculpture of a Group of Workmen in Procession, by Yann Goulet

1914 births
1999 deaths
People from Saint-Nazaire
Breton nationalists
Breton collaborators with Nazi Germany
Irish sculptors
Breton artists
French military personnel of World War II
Naturalised citizens of Ireland
French emigrants to Ireland
20th-century French sculptors
French male sculptors
People sentenced to death in absentia